Martin Joel Wiener (born 1941) is an American academic and author. He is currently a research professor at Rice University.

Keith Joseph gave a copy of Wiener's book English Culture and the Decline of the Industrial Spirit: 1850–1980 to every cabinet minister.

Selected bibliography
Between two worlds : The political thought of Graham Wallas, Oxford: Clarendon Press, 1971.
English culture and the decline of the industrial spirit 1850–1980. Cambridge: Cambridge U.P., 1981.
English culture and the decline of the industrial spirit 1850–1980. Paperback edition. Harmondsworth: Penguin books, 1985.
English culture and the decline of the industrial spirit 1850–1980. New edition. Cambridge: Cambridge U.P., 2004.
 Review article "Treating 'Historical' Sources as Literary Texts: Literary Historicism and Modern British History," The Journal of Modern History Vol. 70, No. 3, September 1998
Reconstructing the criminal : culture, law and policy in England, 1830–1914. Cambridge: Cambridge University Press, 1990.
Men of blood : violence, manliness and criminal justice in Victorian England, New York: Cambridge University Press, 2004.
 An Empire on Trial: Race, murder and justice under British rule 1870–1835, New York: Cambridge University Press, 2008.
  Edgerton, D. (2006) Warfare State: Britain, 1920 – 1970. Cambridge: Cambridge University Press.
  Edgerton, D. (1991) England and the Aeroplane – An Essay on a Militant and Technological Nation.

References

1941 births
Living people
21st-century American historians
21st-century American male writers
Rice University faculty
American male non-fiction writers